Manav Samaj Seva Party (Human Society Service Party), is a political party in Haryana, India. MSSP was formed by the ex-president of the Bahujan Samaj Party Haryana state committee and MP, Aman Kumar Nagra, on 12 May 2002.

References

Political parties in Haryana
2002 establishments in Haryana
Political parties established in 2002